Tony Lee "Bursz" Burse (born April 4, 1965) is a former American football running back who played one season with the Seattle Seahawks of the National Football League (NFL). He was drafted by the Seattle Seahawks in the 12th round of the 1987 NFL Draft. He played college football at Middle Tennessee State University and attended LaFayette High School in LaFayette, Georgia. Burse was also a member of the Miami Dolphins, Sacramento Surge, Detroit Drive/Massachusetts Marauders, Sacramento Gold Miners/San Antonio Texans, Edmonton Eskimos, San Jose SaberCats, Buffalo Destroyers and Toronto Argonauts.

College career
Burse played for the Middle Tennessee Blue Raiders from 1983 to 1986.

Professional career
Burse was selected by the Seattle Seahawks of the NFL with the 324th pick in the 1987 NFL Draft. He was released by the Seahawks in August 1988. He signed with the NFL's Miami Dolphins later in 1988. Burse re-signed with the Seattle Seahawks on March 31, 1989. He was suspended for 30 days on August 12, 1989 for violating the league's substance abuse policy for the second time. He had earlier failed a drug test during the 1988 off-season. Burse was released by the Seahawks on August 16, 1989. He played for the Sacramento Surge of the World League of American Football from 1991 to 1992. He played for the Detroit Drive/Massachusetts Marauders of the Arena Football League (AFL) from 1993 to 1994, earring Second Team All-Arena honors in 1994. Burse played for the Sacramento Gold Miners/San Antonio Texans of the Canadian Football League (CFL) from 1994 to 1995. He played for the Edmonton Eskimos of the CFL from 1996 to 1998. He spent time with the San Jose SaberCats of the AFL in 1999. Burse and Melvin Phillips were traded to the Buffalo Destroyers for Mark Grieb on March 12, 1999. He was placed on the exempt list on October 26, 1999. He played for the Toronto Argonauts of the CFL in 1999. Burse played for the Buffalo Destroyers in 2000. He played for the Toronto Argonauts in 2000. He last played for the Buffalo Destroyers in 2001.

References

External links
Just Sports Stats
totalfootballstats.com

Living people
1965 births
Players of American football from Georgia (U.S. state)
American football running backs
Canadian football running backs
African-American players of American football
African-American players of Canadian football
Middle Tennessee Blue Raiders football players
Seattle Seahawks players
Miami Dolphins players
Sacramento Surge players
Detroit Drive players
Massachusetts Marauders players
Sacramento Gold Miners players
San Antonio Texans players
Edmonton Elks players
San Jose SaberCats players
Buffalo Destroyers players
Toronto Argonauts players
People from LaFayette, Georgia
21st-century African-American people
20th-century African-American sportspeople